Heinz Patzelt (born 1957 in Vienna) is an Austrian lawyer. He has been Secretary General of Amnesty International in Austria since 1998.

Biography

Patzelt attended the Vienna Schottengymnasium officially is a Catholic private gymnasium and he began with engineering degree. later on he changed his major to jurisprudence and graduated with a master's degree. While he was at College he worked for an advertising agency, then worked for a law firm and a software company. In addition, he spent many years volunteering in Malta as a rescue driver, in the care of the disabled and in support of civilians.

Since 1998 Patzelt is Secretary General of Amnesty International in Austria.

Career
On 6 August 2015, Amnesty International Secretary General Heinz Patzelt inspected the refugee camp Bundesbetreuungsstelle in Traiskirchen where more than 4,800 migrants/refugees are housed. Medical expert Siroos Mirzaei from Amnesty International noted that the people had to wait for days in order to get medical help, this due to the vast number of people received over a short period of time. The report also stated that four doctors were present at the refugee camp and that showers and some hygienic facilities were in disrepair. Patzelt claimed, "Austria is currently violating human rights and should focus on unattended children and minors".

See also
 European migrant crisis
 Schottengymnasium

References

External links
 Es ist besser eine Kerze anzuzünden, als die Dunkelheit zu verfluchen

Amnesty International people
1957 births
Lawyers from Vienna
Living people